A normalized 1s Slater-type function is a function which is used in the descriptions of atoms and in a broader way in the description of atoms in molecules. It is particularly important as the accurate quantum theory description of the smallest free atom, hydrogen. It has the form

It is a particular case of a Slater-type orbital (STO) in which the principal quantum number n is 1. The parameter  is called the Slater orbital exponent. Related sets of functions can be used to construct STO-nG basis sets which are used in quantum chemistry.

Applications for hydrogen-like atomic systems 

A hydrogen-like atom  or a hydrogenic atom is an atom with one  electron.  Except for the hydrogen atom itself (which is neutral) these atoms carry positive charge , where  is the atomic number of the atom.  Because hydrogen-like atoms are two-particle systems with an interaction depending only on the distance between the two particles,  their (non-relativistic) Schrödinger equation can be exactly solved in analytic form. The solutions are one-electron functions and are referred to as hydrogen-like atomic orbitals. 
The electronic Hamiltonian (in atomic units) of a Hydrogenic system is given by
, where  is the nuclear charge of the hydrogenic atomic system. The 1s electron of a hydrogenic systems can be accurately described by the corresponding Slater orbital:
, where  is the Slater exponent. This state, the ground state, is the only state that can be described by a Slater orbital. Slater orbitals have no radial nodes, while the excited states of the hydrogen atom have radial nodes.

Exact energy of a hydrogen-like atom 

The energy of a hydrogenic system can be exactly calculated analytically as follows :
, where 

. Using the expression for Slater orbital,  the integrals can be exactly solved. Thus,

. Thus

Non-relativistic energy 

The following energy values are thus calculated by using the expressions for energy and for the Slater exponent.

Hydrogen : H
 and 
−0.5 Eh
−13.60569850 eV
−313.75450000 kcal/mol

Gold : Au(78+)
 and 
−3120.5 Eh
−84913.16433850 eV
−1958141.8345 kcal/mol.

Relativistic energy of Hydrogenic atomic systems 
Hydrogenic atomic systems are suitable models to demonstrate the relativistic effects in atomic systems in a simple way. The energy expectation value can calculated by using the Slater orbitals with or without considering the relativistic correction for the Slater exponent . The relativistically corrected Slater exponent  is given as
.
The relativistic energy of an electron in 1s orbital of a hydrogenic atomic systems is obtained by solving the Dirac equation.
.
Following table illustrates the relativistic corrections in energy and it can be seen how the relativistic correction scales with the atomic number of the system.

References

Atoms
Quantum models